F29 and variants thereof may refer to:

 Fokker F.29, a jetliner
 F29 Retaliator, a flight simulator
 a photoreconnaissance plane, see B-29 Superfortress variants
 Fluorine-29 (F-29 or 29F), an isotope of fluorine